Janet Lippman Abu-Lughod (August 3, 1928 – December 14, 2013) was an American sociologist who made major contributions to world-systems theory and urban sociology.

Early life
Raised in Newark, New Jersey, she attended Weequahic High School, where she was influenced by the works of Lewis Mumford about urbanization.

Academia

Janet Abu-Lughod held graduate degrees from the University of Chicago and University of Massachusetts Amherst. Her teaching career began at the University of Illinois, took her to the American University in Cairo, Smith College, and Northwestern University, where she taught for twenty years and directed several urban studies programmes. In 1950-1952 Abu-Lughod was a director of research for the American Society of Planning Officials, in 1954-1957 – research associate at the University of Pennsylvania, consultant and author for the American Council to Improve Our Neighborhoods. In 1987 she accepted a professorship in sociology and historical studies at the Graduate Faculty of the New School for Social Research, from which she retired as professor emerita in 1998. Upon retirement she held visiting short-term teaching appointments at Bosphorous University in Istanbul and on the International Honors Program at the University of Cairo. She published over a hundred articles and thirteen books dealing with urban sociology, the history and dynamics of the World System, and Middle Eastern cities, including an urban history of Cairo that is still considered one of the classic works on that city: Cairo: 1001 Years of the City Victorious.

In 1976 she was awarded a John Guggenheim Memorial Fellowship for Sociology. Abu-Lughod received over a dozen prestigious national government fellowships and grants to research in the areas of demography, urban sociology, urban planning, economic and social development, world systems, and urbanization in the United States, the Middle East and the Third World.

She was especially well known for her monograph Before European Hegemony: The World System A.D. 1250-1350  wherein she argued that a pre-modern world system extending across Eurasia existed in the 13th century, prior to the formation of the modern world-system identified by Immanuel Wallerstein. Among a variety of factors, Abu-Lughod emphasized the role of Champagne fairs, the Mongol Empire, the Mamluk Sultanate, and the history of the Indian subcontinent in shaping this previous world system. In addition, she argued that the "rise of the West," beginning with the intrusion of armed Portuguese ships into the relatively peaceful trade networks of the Indian Ocean in the 16th century, was not a result of features internal to Europe, but was made possible by a collapse in the previous world system.

Abu-Lughod in her works approaches the social and economic development of global cities with the commitment to seeing and acting on possibilities for constructive social change. The span of her works goes from micro-level studies of territoriality and social change, to the analysis of the diffusion of global cities in the Western and Arab world, to historical studies of medieval cities.

She published several well-received works on American cities including New York, Chicago, Los Angeles: America's Global Cities and Race, Space, and Riots in Chicago, New York, and Los Angeles.

Personal life
She was married in 1951–1991 to Ibrahim Abu-Lughod. They had four children; Lila, Mariam, Deena, and Jawad. She died aged 85 in New York City on December 14, 2013.

Works

References

1928 births
2013 deaths
American sociologists
People from Newark, New Jersey
Weequahic High School alumni
University of Chicago alumni
University of Massachusetts Amherst alumni
University of Illinois Urbana-Champaign faculty
Academic staff of The American University in Cairo
Smith College faculty
Northwestern University faculty
World system scholars
American women academics
American women historians
American women sociologists
American expatriates in Egypt
Historians from New Jersey
Urban sociologists